Iowa Highway 143 (Iowa 143) is a north–south state highway in northwestern Iowa. The route was designated in 1926 when its original number, Primary Road No. 75 was reused for U.S. Highway 75. It was originally a short spur route into Marcus, but was extended north to Iowa 10 in 1938. From 1941 to 1961, the highway extended south from Iowa 3 / Iowa 5 to the Cherokee–Woodbury county line.

Route description
Iowa 143 begins at an intersection with Iowa 3 at the southeastern corner of the city limits of Marcus.  Iowa 3, an east–west highway, meets D Avenue, which carries County Road L36 (CR L36) south of the intersection and Iowa 143 north.  Heading north through Marcus along Ames Street, the highway passes a municipal golf course, cemetery, and high school.  The residential area of Marcus ends abruptly at a Chicago Central and Pacific Railroad line on the northern edge of town.

North of Marcus, the route runs due north on a two-lane road through the farmland of rural Cherokee and O'Brien counties. Iowa 143 ends at an intersection with Iowa 10 between Granville and Paullina. The roadway continues north as CR L36.

History
The road that would become Iowa 143 was called Primary Road No. 75 (No. 75) when the Primary Highway System was created in 1920; it was a short spur route that connected No. 5 to Marcus.  When the U.S. Highway System was created in 1926, No. 75 became Iowa 143 as the 75 designation was applied to U.S. Highway 75.  The spur was paved in mid-1937.

In 1941, the highway extended south to the Cherokee–Woodbury county line north of  Correctionville. In the early 1960s, Iowa 143 was paved between Marcus and Iowa 10, while the segment south of Iowa 3 / Iowa 5 was turned over to Cherokee County.

Major intersections

References

143